Jaime "Ka Jimmy" Tadeo (born March 28, 1938) is a Filipino peasant and organic farming activist.

Biography 
Tadeo was born in Bocaue, Bulacan. He obtained a bachelor's degree in Agriculture from the Araneta University in 1960 and worked for different government agencies from 1962 to 1981. Tadeo was formerly one of the leaders of the militant Kilusang Magbubukid ng Pilipinas (the KMP, or Peasant Movement of the Philippines), formed amid the 1986 People Power Revolution in order to push for agrarian reform, until the peasant movement split into multiple groups in the 1990s.

Shortly after the fall of the Marcos dictatorship, Tadeo was appointed to be part of the 1986 Constitutional Commission where he was the sole peasant representative. In January 1987, Tadeo figured prominently in the demonstrations which led to the Mendiola massacre, a violent dispersal of peasants, workers, and students by state security forces which left 13 dead. According to Tadeo, most of the 13 were part of a "composite team" purposely put to protect him from gunfire.

In 1990, Tadeo was arrested and taken to the maximum security National Penitentiary at Muntinlupa, which supporters claim was due to his outspoken criticism of Corazon Aquino's executive order on agrarian reform. Asked about his views on the president, he remarked that she "[was] running the country like her own hacienda," and retorted "I asked Cory Aquino for land for the peasants and she gave me 'Muntinlupa' (in Tagalog, 'smallest piece of land')."

At present, Tadeo leads a small group of Bulakenyo and Central Luzon farmers through the organization Paragos-Pilipinas.

Scholar James Putzel took the title of his book, A Captive Land: The Politics of Agrarian Reform in the Philippines (1992) on the history of land reform in the Philippines and the United States' role in it, from Tadeo's remark that the Philippines is a "foreign dominated economy," captive to American interests.

References 

1938 births
Living people
20th-century Filipino people
21st-century Filipino people
Filipino activists
Farmers' rights activists
Members of the Philippine Constitutional Commission of 1986
People from Bulacan